A carnet may refer to:

in international law:
A legal authorisation, usually in the context of document allowing the importation of certain goods to countries without paying customs duty. Three types exist:
ATA Carnet, for temporary importation of goods and equipment
Carnet de Passages en Douane, for motor vehicles
TIR Carnet, to simplify administrative formalities of transiting commercial goods carried by international road transport
It can also mean a legal authorisation to provide services in other contexts, such as the carnet of the IFMGA.  The carnet of the IFMGA allows the holder to legally provide mountain skills training and leadership on glaciated terrain.

Other
 Carnet, archaic name of Bordeaux wine producer Château La Tour Carnet
 CARNET, the Croatian Academic and Research Network
 Carnet (ticket), a booklet of tickets used on public transport systems
 Carnets de Géologie, a scientific electronic journal dealing with earth sciences

Places
 Carnet, County Londonderry, a townland in County Londonderry, Northern Ireland
 Carnet, Manche, a commune in France

See also
Cornet (disambiguation)